HP is a cubic-grain black-and-white film from Ilford Photo with a long history. It originated as Hypersensitive Panchromatic plates in 1931. Since then it has progressed through a number of versions, with HP5 plus (HP5+ for short) being the latest. The main competitor of Ilford HP5 Plus is Kodak Tri-X 400.

HP3 went through two speed changes in its history, but only one actual change to the emulsion. In 1960 the 200 ISO/ASA emulsion was relabeled as 400 ISO/ASA with no change to the product. The 200 ISO/ASA speed included an exposure safety margin, but with improvements in light meters this was deemed unnecessary, thus the speed was revised up to 400 ISO/ASA.

On September 23, 2005, Ilford reintroduced its black-and-white single-use camera which includes 27 exposures of HP5 plus film.

References

External links 

 Ilford HP5 plus

Photographic films